Alexoudis is a Greek surname. Notable people with the surname include:

Alexis Alexoudis (born 1972), Greek footballer
Kaloudis Alexoudis (born 1961), Greek volleyball player

Greek-language surnames
Surnames of Greek origin